Kozhikode South is an outgrowth of Kozhikode city in Kerala, India.  Kozhikode South refers to areas like Beypore, Feroke, Areekkad, Nallalam, Cheruvannur, Ramanattukara, Kadalundi and Pantheerankavu. Suburbs like Beypore are famous for boat making.

Suburbs and Townships
 Nallalam, Areekkad and Cheruvannur
 Beypore, Marad and Payyanakkal
 Feroke, Kadalundi and Ramanattukara
 Olavanna, Perumugham and Kolathara
 Farook College township, Feroke and Pruthippara
Chaliyam, pantheerankave

History
The word Kozhikode or Calicut originally referred to the Palayam and Valiyangadi regions only.  When the city grew, Nadakkavu and Mavoor Road were also considered part of the city.  Today, Medical College area, West Hill area and Kallayi area are also considered part of the city.  Suburbs like  Feroke, Cheruvannur, Ramanattukara and Pantheerankavu are not treated part of Kozhikode city because they have their own separate administrative structure.

Image gallery

See also
 Kozhikode city
 Kozhikode North
 Kozhikode East
 Kozhikode Beach

Location

References

Best Grocery Shopping in Calicut

Suburbs of Kozhikode
Kozhikode south